Hannah Emily Anderson (born September 1, 1989) is a Canadian actress. She is known for her roles in the films Jigsaw and What Keeps You Alive, and the TV series The Purge.

Early life 
Anderson was born in Winnipeg, Manitoba. She graduated from the George Brown Theatre School in Toronto.

Career 
In January 2017, Anderson joined the cast of the film Jigsaw, the eighth film in the Saw franchise, playing the role of Eleanor Bonneville. The film was released in October 2017 and grossed $103 million worldwide, but received generally negative reviews from critics.

In June 2017, Anderson was cast as Jackie in the 2018 horror film What Keeps You Alive, alongside her Jigsaw co-star Brittany Allen. The film had its wide release in August 2018, and received positive reviews from critics. Dennis Harvey of Variety magazine wrote: "Anderson is very good in a pocket-size variation on Rosamund Pike's 'Gone Girl' type".

In April 2018, Anderson was cast as Jenna Betancourt, an anti-Purge proponent, in the horror series The Purge. The series is based on the franchise of the same name. The series ran for two seasons, and was cancelled in May 2020. Anderson starred as Joy in the 2022 horror film Dark Nature.

Filmography

Film

Television

References

External links 
 

1989 births
Living people
21st-century Canadian actresses
Canadian film actresses
Canadian television actresses
Actresses from Winnipeg
George Brown College alumni